The 2010 ITM Cup season was the fifth season of New Zealand's provincial rugby union competition since it turned professional in 2006. The regular season began on July 29, when Taranaki hosted Northland. It involved the top fourteen rugby unions of New Zealand. For sponsorship reasons, the competition was known as the ITM Cup and it was the first season under the lead sponsor. The winner of the competition, Canterbury was promoted along with the top seventh placed teams to the Premiership, the bottom seventh placed teams were relegated to the Championship.

Format
The ITM Cup standings were sorted by a competition points system. Four points were awarded to the winning team, a draw equaled two points, whilst a loss amounted to zero points. Unions could also win their side a respectable bonus point. To receive a bonus point, they must have scored four tries or more or lose by seven or fewer points or less. Each team was placed on their total points received. If necessary of a tiebreaker, when two or more teams finish on equal points, the union who defeated the other in a head-to-head got placed higher. In case of a draw between them, the side with the biggest points deferential margin got rights to be ranked above. If they were tied on points difference, it was then decided by a highest scored try count or a coin toss. This seeding format was implemented since the beginning of the 2006 competition.

The competition was a decider for the top and bottom seven placed unions that would respectively become apart of the Premiership and Championship divisions for the 2011 season. This would form a promotion-relegation process with the winner of the Championship receiving automatic promotion to the Premiership, replacing the seventh-placed team in the Premiership which would be relegated to the Championship for the following year. The regular season consisted of two types of matches where each team played the other thirteen unions over the course of thirteen consecutive weeks. Furthermore teams played home and away, either hosting six games and travelling for seven or hosting seven and travelling for six. The finals format allowed the top four teams move on to the semi-finals. The top two winners, based on table points, received a home semi-final. In the first round of the finals, the semi-finals, the second placed winner hosted the third placed winner, and the first placed winner hosted the fourth placed winner. The final was hosted by the top remaining seed.

Standings
Source: ITM Cup standings 2010

Standings progression

Regular season
The 2010 ITM Cup was played across thirteen weeks with every team playing one another during Thursday to Sunday night fixtures. The competition started on Thursday, July 29, with Taranaki taking on Northland at Yarrow Stadium.

Week 1

Week 2

Week 3

Week 4

Week 5

Week 6

Week 7

Week 8

Week 9

Week 10

Week 11

Week 12

Week 13

Play-offs

Semi-finals

Final

{| border="0" width="100%" 
|-
|

Statistics

Leading point scorers

Source: The weekly reviews of the matches published on provincial.rugby (see "Report" in the individual match scoring stats).

Leading try scorers

Source: The weekly reviews of the matches published on provincial.rugby (see "Report" in the individual match scoring stats).

Points by week

Source: ITM Cup Fixtures and Results 2010

Tries by week

Source: The weekly reviews of the matches published on provincial.rugby (see "Report" in the individual match scoring stats).

Ranfurly Shield

Pre-season challenges

References

External links

National Provincial Championship
2010 in New Zealand rugby union
2010 rugby union tournaments for clubs